The 2006 Ivan Hlinka Memorial Tournament was an ice hockey tournament held in Břeclav, Czech Republic and Piešťany, Slovakia between August 8, 2006 and August 12, 2006. The venues used for the tournament were Zimní Stadion in Břeclav and Zimny Stadion in Piešťany. Canada defeated the United States of America 3-0 in the final to claim the gold medal, while Russia defeated Sweden 4-2 to capture the bronze medal.

Challenge results

Preliminary round

Group A

Group B

Final round
Schedule
All times local (UTC +1)

Seventh place game

Fifth place game

Bronze medal game

Gold medal game

Final standings

External links
Results from Hockey Canada

Ivan Hlinka Memorial Tournament, 2006
2006
International ice hockey competitions hosted by Slovakia
International ice hockey competitions hosted by the Czech Republic
Ivan
2006–07 in Slovak ice hockey